Township Line Run is a  long 2nd order tributary to Sewickley Creek in Westmoreland County, Pennsylvania.  Township Line Run straddles to boundary between Unity and Hempfield Township and of Mount Pleasant and Hempfield Township.  This is the only stream of this name in the United States.

Course
Township Line Run rises in Denison, Pennsylvania, and then flows southwest to join Sewickley Creek at Armbrust.

Watershed
Township Line Run drains  of area, receives about 42.7 in/year of precipitation, has a wetness index of 371.26, and is about 48% forested.

References

 
Tributaries of the Ohio River
Rivers of Pennsylvania
Rivers of Westmoreland County, Pennsylvania
Allegheny Plateau